Operation Wasteland was an undercover investigation into organized crime control of the waste disposal industry in New York City.

The investigation resulted in the indictment and conviction of over one hundred participants in price-fixing and bid rigging of waste hauling contracts in the city.

The story is detailed in the book, Takedown, the Fall of the Last Mafia Empire, by Detective Rick Cowan and co-author Douglas Century, and in Gone Tomorrow: The Hidden Life of Garbage by Heather Rogers.

References

American Mafia events
Environment of New York City
Law enforcement in New York City
Waste collection
Waste in the United States